The NWA Fusion Tag Team Championship are the tag team titles of the Virginia territory of the National Wrestling Alliance.

The titles were formed in the WWC promotion in 1994 when Thunderstorm (Jimmy Jack Thunder & Matt Storm) defeated Carjacker and Cat Burglar in a tournament final. The title has stayed with the promotion throughout its various name changes and NWA membership being known as the WWC, APWA, RCW (Richmond Championship Wrestling), and NWA New York (State) Tag Team Championship before the promotion finally relocated to the Commonwealth of Virginia and became known as NWA Virginia.  NWA Virginia was renamed NWA Fusion in mid-2008.

Title history

References
NWA Virginia's official website

National Wrestling Alliance championships
Regional professional wrestling championships